TV Girl is an American indie pop band from San Diego, California, consisting of Brad Petering, Brayden Patterson, Reagan Landen, Jason Wyman, and Wyatt Harmon. The group is now based in Los Angeles.

TV Girl's debut album French Exit is considered a staple in the indie music scene, being called "remarkably solid" by Bandwagon Magazine and "one of the most focused indie-pop albums of the past decade" by The Daily Targum.

TV Girl's 2012 mixtape The Wild, The Innocent, The TV Shuffle was released and given away for free with an accompanying downloadable coloring book. This mixtape would have been their debut album, but the duo expressed that this work didn't feel official enough to be their first album and felt that the term mixtape was more appropriate.

Artistry

Influences
TV Girl frequently samples songs and media from the 1960s in their music. An example of this is seen in the song "Lover's Rock," where the backing track is created from a looped sample of the intro to the Shirelles' single "The Dance is Over", which was originally released in 1960. In a post to Reddit, Petering writes he "..never gets tired of seeking out old and obscure music. I listen to lots of music and I find my loops and sounds that way."

Musical style and songwriting
TV Girl is generally regarded as indie pop, or sometimes as hypnotic pop. Similarly to trip hop, the band blends elements of hip hop and electronic music. This is due to their use of sampling, keyboards, and reverb effects. The duo was upset when their music was labeled "sundrenched California pop," pointing out that there are no lyrical allusions in their music that warrant the title.

Lyrically, a majority of TV Girl's discography revolves around love and relationships. One example of this could be the song “Lover's Rock”, a love ballad named after the reggae sub-genre of lover's rock. Their subject matter is nostalgic and sad, but simultaneously sarcastic and humorous. Some motifs in the duo's lyrics include women, heartbreak, cynicism, sex, memories, cigarettes, hair, women's first names, and loneliness. They are also known for their use of vintage audio samples that are sampled into many of their songs.

Growth through TikTok virality 
Brad Petering, the lead singer of the band, has acknowledged the positive impact TikTok has had on the band itself, and in particular, their album French Exit. However, multiple members of the band continue to express a dislike of this growth, stating that TV Girl has become a band defined by the "Tik-tok teen", part of a recent trend in which artists or bands release songs which then explode in popularity due to use on TikTok while having other tracks of theirs go nearly unnoticed by many due to them being overshadowed by more popular songs.

Discography

Studio albums
 French Exit (2014)
 Who Really Cares (2016)
 Death of a Party Girl (2018)
 The Night in Question: French Exit Outtakes (2020)
 Summer's Over (2021)

Collaborative albums
 Maddie Acid's Purple Hearts Club Band (2018) (with Madison Acid)
 Aestheticadelica (2020) (with Bloodbath64)
 Summer's Over (2021) (with Jordana)

Mixtapes 
 The Wild, The Innocent, The TV Shuffle (2012)

Extended plays 
 TV Girl (2010)
 Benny and the Jetts (2011)
 Lonely Women (2013)

Singles 
 "Girls Like Me" (2011)
 "Diet-Coke" (2012)
 "Average Guy (Blame)" (2013)
 "She Smokes in Bed" (2013)
 "Birds Dont Sing" (2014)
 "Natalie Wood" (2015)

Other charted songs

Produced albums 
Posthumous Release (2013) (by Coma Cinema)

Notes

References 

Musical groups established in 2010
Indie pop groups from California
Musical groups from San Diego
2010 establishments in California